John N. Nystrom (June 16, 1933 – December 5, 2004) was an American politician in the state of Iowa.

Nystrom was born in Boone, Iowa. He attended Iowa State University and was an automobile dealer. He served in the Iowa State Senate from 1973 to 1991, and House of Representatives from 1971 to 1973, as a Republican.

References

1933 births
2004 deaths
People from Boone, Iowa
Iowa State University alumni
Businesspeople from Iowa
Republican Party Iowa state senators
Republican Party members of the Iowa House of Representatives